Jaime José Moreno Ciorciari (born 30 March 1995) is a footballer who plays as a striker for SJK. Born in Venezuela, he represents the Nicaragua national team.

Club career
Born in Puerto la Cruz from a Nicaraguan father and an Italian-Venezuelan mother, Moreno graduated with Deportivo Anzoátegui's youth setup. He played his first match as a professional on 21 October 2012, coming on as a late substitute in a 2–0 home win against Deportivo Petare for the Primera División championship.

Moreno scored his first goal on 28 April 2013, netting his side's last in a 3–2 home success over Mineros de Guayana. Despite being only a backup in 2012–13, he was an undisputed starter in 2013–14, appearing in 29 matches and scoring nine goals.

On 17 June 2014 Moreno was loaned to Cyprus First Division's AEL Limassol, in a season-long deal. He made no appearances for the side, and eventually returned to DANZ in December.

On 27 January 2015 Moreno signed a three-year deal with Málaga CF, being assigned to the reserves in Tercera División. On 13 February he was loaned to Segunda División B's CD El Palo, until June.

On 24 August 2018, after loans at Cultural y Deportiva Leonesa and Lorca FC, Moreno signed a permanent contract with Internacional de Madrid in the third division.

On 2 January 2023, Moreno joined Veikkausliiga club SJK ahead of the 2023 season.

International career

International goals
Scores and results list Nicaragua's goal tally first.

References

External links
 AF Venezuela profile
 
 
 

1995 births
Living people
People from Anzoátegui
People with acquired Nicaraguan citizenship
Nicaraguan men's footballers
Nicaragua international footballers
Venezuelan men's footballers
Venezuela under-20 international footballers
Nicaraguan people of Venezuelan descent
Nicaraguan people of Italian descent
Venezuelan people of Nicaraguan descent
Venezuelan people of Italian descent
Association football forwards
Deportivo Anzoátegui players
AEL Limassol players
Atlético Malagueño players
Cultural Leonesa footballers
Internacional de Madrid players
Lorca FC players
Real Estelí F.C. players
Asociación Civil Deportivo Lara players
Estudiantes de Mérida players
Diriangén FC players
Club Sol de América footballers
Seinäjoen Jalkapallokerho players
Segunda División B players
Tercera División players
Venezuelan Primera División players
Paraguayan Primera División players
2015 South American Youth Football Championship players
2017 Copa Centroamericana players
Nicaraguan expatriate footballers
Venezuelan expatriate footballers
Expatriate footballers in Cyprus
Expatriate footballers in Spain
Expatriate footballers in Paraguay
Expatriate footballers in Finland
Nicaraguan expatriate sportspeople in Cyprus
Nicaraguan expatriate sportspeople in Spain